Telepace is an Italy-based broadcasting network, established in 1979, that carries Roman Catholic-themed programming. The programs include programming from Centro Televisivo Vaticano. Its headquarters are in Cerna, a frazione of Sant'Anna d'Alfaedo, Italy, with branches in Trento, Agrigento, Lodi, Fátima and Jerusalem.

Broadcasting
It is broadcast in Italy on DTT over various mux, in the United States it is available FTA on Glorystar and Spiritcast, in Australia it is available FTA on UBI World TV. Also on Satellite TV, Telepace broadcast also as TV Syndication in Italy with more than 50 affiliated television stations.

The channel started at the beginning of 2014 to air in high definition on Eutelsat HotBird satellites and on SKY Italia and Tivù Sat. The SD version was dropped from HotBird the same day. Up to now, native HD programs only occur during live telecasts from Vatican City distributed by the Centro Televisivo Vaticano, and during repeats of the above.

On August 17, 2021, the channel left satellite Hot Bird 13B and continue on Optus D2 at 152°East 12519 MHz V, Sr 22500 3/4 MPEG-2 SD.

See also 
 Catholic television
 Catholic television channels
 Catholic television networks
 Vatican Media
 Padre Pio TV
 Radio Maria

Notes

External links 
Telepace – Official Website 
Telepace online broadcast

Free-to-air
International broadcasters
Catholic television networks
Commercial-free television networks
Television channels and stations established in 1979
Television channels in Italy